Modern pentathlon at the 2019 Military World Games was held in Wuhan, China from 22 to 26 October 2019.

Medal summary

References 
 2019 Military World Games Results - Page 142

Modern pentathlon
2019